Adobe Station was a railroad stop on the Telegraph Stage line in Kern County, California, southeast of Greenfield, during the early 1870s. It was reported that Stanley Hyde, "who had been in charge," was murdered that year. A hotel was operated by Peter P. Roquette in 1880.

References

Railway stations in Kern County, California